is a passenger railway station located in the southern part of the town of Ōi, Kanagawa, Japan, operated by Central Japan Railway Company (JR Central).

Lines
Kami-Ōi Station is served by the Gotemba Line and is 6.5 kilometers from the terminus of the line at Kōzu Station.

Station layout 
Kami-Ōi Station has two opposed side platforms and wooden station building. When it opened, it had only a single through platform, but just before the electrification of the Gotemba Line, facilities for trains' crossing had been attached and the station came to have two platforms. The station is unattended.

History
Kami-Ōi Station was opened on June 1, 1948 on the Japan National Railways (JNR) Gotemba Line for passenger service only. The route through the station was electrified in 1968. Freight services were discontinued on February 1, 1971. On April 1, 1987 along with privatization and division of JNR, the station came under control of the Central Japan Railway Company. It has been unattended since March 22, 1997.

Station numbering was introduced to the Gotemba Line in March 2018; Kami-Ōi Station was assigned station number CB02.

Passenger statistics
In fiscal 2018, the station was used by an average of 490 passengers daily (boarding passengers only).

The passenger figures (boarding passengers only) for previous years are as shown below.

Surrounding area
Ōi Town Office
Odawara City Office Soga Branch Office
The Dai-ichi Mutual Life Insurance Company Ōi Main Office
Ebara Foods Industry Central Research Facility

See also
List of railway stations in Japan

References

External links

 Station information (Gotembasen.net) 

Railway stations in Japan opened in 1948
Ōi, Kanagawa